Acanthogalathea parva is an extinct species of squat lobster in the family Galatheidae. It was extant during the Eocene and Oligocene.

References

Squat lobsters